Eagle Lake is a lake in Blue Earth County, Minnesota, in the United States. The city of Eagle Lake, Minnesota is located near this lake.

Eagle Lake was named from the many bald eagle nests seen by early surveyors near the lake.

See also
List of lakes in Minnesota

References

Lakes of Minnesota
Lakes of Blue Earth County, Minnesota